"Duty and Honor" is the seventh episode of the first season of the period drama television series The Americans. It originally aired on FX in the United States on March 13, 2013.

Plot
Philip Jennings (Matthew Rhys) is sent to New York City to discredit a Polish dissident. He meets up with Irina Semenova (Marina Squerciati), a former lover whom he knew back in Russia. They attend a travel agent convention where Irina poses as a travel agent from Montreal. Irina tells Philip that she has been waiting a long time to see him again. Irina is set to meet with Charles Duluth (Reg Rogers), a journalist and contact of Philip's, and Andrzej Bielawski, a Polish resistance leader who has been ordained a priest despite having a wife and children whom he has deserted to pursue his religious vocation. Irina pretends to be Polish.

The three of them go out to dinner. Shortly after, Charles leaves Irina and Andrzej alone. As they walk back to the hotel, Irina convinces Andrzej to let his guards hang back and give them more peace. Philip, dressed as a mugger, steals from them and the guards give chase. Later at the hotel, Irina drugs Andrzej. Philip apologizes to Irina for hurting her during the mugging. She tells him that he fathered a child with her, who is now 18 years old. Irina tells Philip that she wants to start a new life with him, before Philip beats her, giving her bruises on her face. Andrzej wakes up the next morning as a US official enters with photos of the beaten Irina, claiming that she was brutally beaten and raped by Andrzej.

Philip sleeps with Irina, and the same night receives a call from an apologetic Elizabeth (Keri Russell), who asks him to come home. Irina tells Philip that their son (Mischa Semenov) is in the army. Irina confides in Philip that she has grown tired of working with the KGB, believing that what they did to Andrzej was cruel. She wants to run away with Philip, but Philip believes she is lying to him about having a son together. Philip refuses to go with her, saying that he cannot leave his family.

While Philip is in New York, Elizabeth and the children are invited to dinner with the Beemans. Sandra (Susan Misner) informs Elizabeth that Stan (Noah Emmerich) is busy working. She confides in Elizabeth that her marriage with Stan isn't working, and that she is envious of Elizabeth and Philip for being able to work together professionally. Elizabeth remarks that marriage is hard and Sandra replies: "At the end of the day, you either choose to keep going or you don’t."

Meanwhile, Stan and Chris Amador (Maximiliano Hernández) go out to a bar. Amador remarks that Stan is more comfortable at work than he is in his personal life. He suggests that Stan chat up a girl at the bar, but instead Stan meets up with Nina (Annet Mahendru). They have sex. Nina tells him that she will not blackmail him because of their liaison and that it doesn't have to happen again if he doesn't want it to.

Philip returns from New York, where Elizabeth tells him she wants to work on their marriage. She asks him if anything happened between him and Irina and he says no.

Production
The episode was written by Joshua Brand and directed by Alex Chapple.

Reception
In its original American broadcast on March 13, 2013, "Duty and Honor" was watched by 1.70 million viewers, according to Nielsen ratings.

References

External links
 

The Americans (season 1) episodes
2013 American television episodes